Mohamed Lamine Cisse (born 10 February 1982 in Conakry) is a Guinean footballer who currently plays for K.R.C. Mechelen in Belgium, as a central defender.

After starting his football career with Horoya AC, Cisse made his professional debuts in 2003, with Belgium's Royal Antwerp FC. In the 2007 summer transfer window, he signed for Turkish side Bursaspor, being almost unheard of over the course of one season - the team could only rank in 13th position - and being released.

External links
Turkish Football Federation profile

1982 births
Living people
Guinean footballers
Association football defenders
Challenger Pro League players
Royal Antwerp F.C. players
Süper Lig players
Bursaspor footballers
Guinea international footballers
2008 Africa Cup of Nations players
Guinean expatriate footballers
Expatriate footballers in Belgium
Expatriate footballers in Turkey
Horoya AC players